The Eddie Capra Mysteries is an American mystery television series starring Vincent Baggetta as a lawyer who investigates murders and has a knack for solving them. Original episodes aired on NBC from September 8, 1978, to January 12, 1979.

Cast
 Vincent Baggetta . . . Eddie Capra
 Wendy Phillips . . . Lacey Brown
 Ken Swofford . . . J. J. Devlin
 Michael Horton . . . Harvey Winchell
 Seven Ann McDonald . . . Jennie Brown

Synopsis

Eddie Capra is an unconventional young lawyer who recently graduated from New York University Law School and works for Devlin, Linkman, and O'Brien, a conventional, snooty, and very prestigious law firm in Los Angeles, California, that specializes in criminal cases. Headstrong, rebellious, and quirky, shunning court appearances because he dislikes wearing a tie and usually ignoring established legal and police procedures, Eddie tends to rush off and play detective when one of the firm's clients is indicted, seeking evidence with which to exonerate the client – sometimes to the consternation of his colleagues – before the case ever reaches court. Lacey Brown is his secretary, personal friend, and sometime girlfriend, and Jennie is her precocious daughter. Harvey Winchell, an investigator for the firm, is Eddie's enthusiastic young assistant, and J. J. Devlin, an irascible senior partner in the firm, is Eddie's boss.

Each episode is constructed in the "classic style" of a detective show, opening with a graphic depiction of a puzzling murder and then following Eddie as he interviews witnesses and other people who might not be telling the truth and uncovers clues missed by the authorities one-by-one until they lead to the killer. In the episode's climax, Eddie usually gathers all the suspects in one room – often a courtroom – and uses deductive reasoning to explain which one of them is guilty.

The series employs a gimmick in which viewers – who receive no more or less information than Eddie – are challenged to identify the murderer before Eddie does.

Production

Peter S. Fischer created The Eddie Capra Mysteries. Episode directors included James Frawley, William Wiard, Edward M. Abroms, Jim Benson, Ivan Dixon, Sigmund Neufeld, Jr., Ron Satlof, and Nicholas Sgarro, and writers included Fischer, Robert C. Dennis, Peter Allan Fields, Ted Leighton, and Michael Rhodes. Fischer, Stuart Cohen, and James Duff McAdams were among the show's producers. John Cacavas and John Addison composed music for the show.

Some scripts used in The Eddie Capra Mysteries were adapted from scripts intended for the canceled 1975–1976 NBC series Ellery Queen.

Broadcast history

Premiering on September 8, 1978 with a two-hour pilot episode, The Eddie Capra Mysteries aired on NBC on Fridays at 10:00 p.m. throughout the rest of its run. Its last original episode aired on January 12, 1979. During the summer of 1979, NBC broadcast reruns of the show in its 10:00 p.m. Friday time slot from June to September.

Reruns of The Eddie Capra Mysteries returned to the air in prime time in the summer of 1990, when CBS broadcast episodes of the show at 9:00 p.m. on Thursdays from July 26 to August 30 as a temporary replacement for Wiseguy.
In the United Kingdom, the series aired on BBC One in 1980.

Episodes

References

External links
The Eddie Capra Mysteries opening credits on YouTube

NBC original programming
1978 American television series debuts
1979 American television series endings
1970s American crime television series
1970s American legal television series
1970s American mystery television series
American detective television series
Television series by Universal Television
Television shows set in Los Angeles
English-language television shows
Television series created by Peter S. Fischer